The 2020–21 UEFA Champions League was the 66th season of Europe's premier club football tournament organised by UEFA, and the 29th season since it was renamed from the European Champion Clubs' Cup to the UEFA Champions League.

Chelsea defeated Manchester City 1–0 in the final, which was played at the Estádio do Dragão in Porto, Portugal. The Atatürk Olympic Stadium in Istanbul, Turkey, was originally appointed to host the 2020 UEFA Champions League Final, but it was moved due to the COVID-19 pandemic in Europe to the Estádio da Luz in Lisbon. Istanbul was again appointed to host the final of the 2021 edition, but was eventually moved to Estádio do Dragão after Turkey was placed on the United Kingdom's red list for tourists and hosting it in England was ruled out.

Bayern Munich were the defending champions, but were eliminated in the quarter-finals by Paris Saint-Germain, whom they had beaten in the previous year's final. As the winners of the 2020–21 UEFA Champions League, Chelsea played against Villarreal, the winners of the 2020–21 UEFA Europa League, in the 2021 UEFA Super Cup. They were also the European entry for the 2021 FIFA Club World Cup. Since they had already qualified to the 2021–22 UEFA Champions League group stage through their league performance, the berth originally reserved for the Champions League title holders has been transferred to the Champions of the 2020–21 Süper Lig, Beşiktaş, the 11th ranked association according to the next season access-list.

The 2020–21 season was the last season of UEFA European club competitions to feature the away goals rule.

Association team allocation
A total of 79 teams from 54 of the 55 UEFA member associations participate in the 2020–21 UEFA Champions League (the exception being Liechtenstein, which does not organise a domestic league). The association ranking based on the UEFA country coefficients is used to determine the number of participating teams for each association:
Associations 1–4 each have four teams qualify.
Associations 5–6 each have three teams qualify.
Associations 7–15 each have two teams qualify.
Associations 16–55 (except Liechtenstein) each have one team qualify.
The winners of the 2019–20 UEFA Champions League and 2019–20 UEFA Europa League are each given an additional entry if they do not qualify for the 2020–21 UEFA Champions League through their domestic leagues. However, the Champions League and Europa League title holders have qualified through their domestic leagues, meaning the two additional entries are not necessary for this season.

Association ranking
For the 2020–21 UEFA Champions League, the associations are allocated places according to their 2019 UEFA country coefficients, which takes into account their performance in European competitions from 2014–15 to 2018–19.

Apart from the allocation based on the country coefficients, associations may have additional teams participating in the Champions League, as noted below:
 – Additional berth for UEFA Champions League title holders
 – Additional berth for UEFA Europa League title holders

Distribution
The following is the access list for this season.

Changes were made to the default access list since the Champions League title holders, Bayern Munich, and the Europa League title holders, Sevilla, which were guaranteed berths in the Champions League group stage, already qualified for the Champions League group stage via their domestic leagues. However, as a result of schedule delays to both the 2019–20 and 2020–21 European seasons due to the COVID-19 pandemic, the 2020–21 European season started before the conclusion of the 2019–20 European season. Therefore, the changes to the access list that should be made based on the Champions League and Europa League title holders could not be certain until matches of the earlier qualifying rounds had been played and/or their draws had been made. UEFA used "adaptive re-balancing" to change the access list once the berths for the Champions League and Europa League title holders were determined, and rounds which had already been drawn or played by the time the title holders were determined would not be impacted (Regulations Article 3.04). The following changes were made:
At the time when the draws for the first qualifying round and second qualifying round (Champions Path) were held on 9 and 10 August 2020, it was not certain whether the Champions League title holder berth would be vacated as one of the eight quarter-finalists of the 2019–20 UEFA Champions League, Lyon, did not qualify for the 2020–21 UEFA Champions League group stage via their domestic league. Therefore, these draws proceeded as normal per the default access list, and the matches drawn, which were played on 18–19 and 25–26 August 2020, were not changed even though after the semi-finals of the 2019–20 UEFA Champions League, which were played on 18–19 August 2020, it was confirmed both finalists, Bayern Munich and Paris Saint-Germain, already qualified for the 2020–21 UEFA Champions League group stage via their domestic leagues, meaning the Champions League title holder berth would be vacated. As a result, "adaptive re-balancing" started from the third qualifying round (Champions Path), whose draw was held on 31 August 2020, and the following changes to the access list were made:
The champions of association 11 (Netherlands), Ajax, entered the group stage instead of the play-off round (Champions Path).
The champions of associations 13 and 14 (Czech Republic and Greece), Slavia Prague and Olympiacos, entered the play-off round (Champions Path) instead of the third qualifying round (Champions Path).
At the time when the draw for the second qualifying round (League Path) was held on 10 August 2020, it was not certain whether the Europa League title holder berth would be vacated as four of the quarter-finalists of the 2019–20 UEFA Europa League, Wolverhampton Wanderers, Bayer Leverkusen, Copenhagen and Basel, did not qualify for the 2020–21 UEFA Champions League group stage via their domestic leagues. Therefore, this draw proceeded as normal per the default access list, and the matches drawn, which were played on 25–26 August 2020, were not changed even though after the quarter-finals of the 2019–20 UEFA Europa League, which were played on 10–11 August 2020, it was confirmed all four semi-finalists, Sevilla, Manchester United, Internazionale and Shakhtar Donetsk, already qualified for the 2020–21 UEFA Champions League group stage via their domestic leagues, meaning the Europa League title holder berth would be vacated. As a result, "adaptive re-balancing" started from the third qualifying round (League Path), whose draw was held on 31 August 2020, and the following changes to the access list were made:
The third-placed team of association 5 (France), Rennes, entered the group stage instead of the third qualifying round (League Path).
The third-placed team of association 6 (Russia), Krasnodar, entered the play-off round (League Path) instead of the third qualifying round (League Path).

Teams

In early April 2020, UEFA announced that due to the COVID-19 pandemic in Europe, the deadline for entering the tournament had been postponed until further notice. UEFA also sent a letter to all member associations that domestic leagues must be completed in full without ending prematurely in order to qualify for European competitions. After meeting with the 55 UEFA associations on 21 April 2020, UEFA strongly recommended them to finish domestic top league and cup competitions, although in some special cases where it is not possible, UEFA would develop guidelines concerning participation in its club competitions in case of a cancelled league or cup. After the UEFA Executive Committee meeting on 23 April 2020, UEFA announced that if a domestic competition is prematurely terminated for legitimate reasons in accordance with conditions related to public health or economic problems, the national associations concerned are required to select their participating teams for the 2020–21 UEFA club competitions based on sporting merit in the 2019–20 domestic competitions, and UEFA reserves the right to refuse their admission if UEFA deems the termination of the competitions not legitimate, or the selection procedure not objective, transparent and non-discriminatory, or the team is perceived by the public as qualifying unfairly. A suspended domestic competition may also be restarted with a different format from the original one in a manner which would still facilitate qualification on sporting merit. All leagues should communicate to UEFA by 25 May 2020 whether they intend to restart their competitions, but this deadline was later extended. On 17 June 2020, UEFA announced that associations must enter their teams by 3 August 2020.

The labels in the parentheses show how each team qualified for the place of its starting round:
TH: Champions League title holders
EL: Europa League title holders
1st, 2nd, 3rd, 4th, etc.: League positions of the previous season
Abd-: League positions of abandoned season due to the COVID-19 pandemic in Europe as determined by the national association; all teams are subject to approval by UEFA as per the guidelines for entry to European competitions in response to the COVID-19 pandemic.

The second qualifying round, third qualifying round and play-off round are divided into Champions Path (CH) and League Path (LP).

Notes

Schedule
The schedule of the competition was as follows (all draws were held at the UEFA headquarters in Nyon, Switzerland unless otherwise stated). The tournament would originally have started in June 2020, but had been delayed to August due to the COVID-19 pandemic in Europe. The new schedule was announced by the UEFA Executive Committee on 17 June 2020. All qualifying matches, excluding the play-off round, were played as single leg matches, hosted by one of the teams decided by draw (except the preliminary round which was played at neutral venue).

The group stage draw was originally to be held at the Stavros Niarchos Foundation Cultural Center in Athens, Greece, but UEFA announced on 9 September 2020 that it would be relocated to Nyon, but it was eventually held at nearby Geneva.

The original schedule of the competition, as planned before the pandemic, was as follows (all draws were to be held at the UEFA headquarters in Nyon, Switzerland, unless stated otherwise).

Major revision to schedule
The major revision to schedule of the competition, as planned before relocation the final from Istanbul, was as follows (all draws were to be held at the UEFA headquarters in Nyon, Switzerland, unless stated otherwise).

Effects of the COVID-19 pandemic

Due to the COVID-19 pandemic in Europe, the following special rules were applicable to the competition:
If there were travel restrictions related to the COVID-19 pandemic that prevented the away team from entering the home team's country or returning to their own country, the match could be played at a neutral country or the away team's country that allowed the match to take place.
If a team refused to play or was considered responsible for a match not taking place, they were considered to have forfeited the match. If both teams refused to play or were considered responsible for a match not taking place, both teams were disqualified.
If a team had players and/or officials tested positive for SARS-2 coronavirus preventing them from playing the match before the deadline set by UEFA, they were considered to have forfeited the match.

On 24 September 2020, UEFA announced that five substitutions would be permitted from the group stage onward, with a sixth allowed in extra time. However, each team was only given three opportunities to make substitutions during matches, with a fourth opportunity in extra time, excluding substitutions made at half-time, before the start of extra time and at half-time in extra time. Consequently, a maximum of twelve players could be listed on the substitute bench.

All qualifying matches were played behind closed doors. Following the partial return of fans at the 2020 UEFA Super Cup, UEFA announced on 1 October 2020 that matches from the group stage onward could be played at 30% capacity if allowed by the local authorities.

The final was originally scheduled to be played at the Krestovsky Stadium in Saint Petersburg, Russia. However, due to the postponement and relocation of the 2020 final to Lisbon as a result of the COVID-19 pandemic in Europe, the final hosts were shifted back a year, with the Atatürk Olympic Stadium in Istanbul, Turkey instead planning to host the 2021 final. However, on 13 May 2021 UEFA announced that the final would be relocated to Porto in order to allow fans to attend the match.

Qualifying rounds

Preliminary round

The losers of both semi-final and final rounds entered the 2020–21 UEFA Europa League second qualifying round.

First qualifying round

The losers entered the 2020–21 UEFA Europa League second qualifying round.

Second qualifying round

From the ten losers of Champions Path, two teams, Tirana and Ludogorets Razgrad, determined by a draw held on 31 August 2020 after the Europa League second qualifying round draw, entered the 2020–21 UEFA Europa League play-off round (Champions Path), while the other eight teams entered the 2020–21 UEFA Europa League third qualifying round (Champions Path). The losers of League Path entered the 2020–21 UEFA Europa League third qualifying round (Main Path).

Third qualifying round

The losers of Champions Path entered the 2020–21 UEFA Europa League play-off round (Champions Path). The losers of League Path entered the 2020–21 UEFA Europa League group stage.

Play-off round

The losers of both Champions Path and League Path entered the 2020–21 UEFA Europa League group stage.

Group stage

A total of 32 teams played in the group stage, from fifteen countries: 26 teams which entered in this stage, and the six winners of the play-off round (four from Champions Path, two from League Path).

The draw for the group stage was held on 1 October 2020, 17:00 CEST, at the RTS Studios in Geneva, Switzerland. The 32 teams were drawn into eight groups of four, with the restriction that teams from the same association could not be drawn against each other. For the draw, the teams were seeded into four pots based on the following principles (introduced starting 2015–16 season):
Pot 1 contained the Champions League and Europa League title holders, and the champions of the top six associations based on their 2019 UEFA country coefficients. As the Champions League title holder, Bayern Munich, were also their national champions, the champions of the association ranked seventh, Porto, was also seeded in pot 1.
Pot 2, 3 and 4 contained the remaining teams, seeded based on their 2020 UEFA club coefficients.

In each group, teams played against each other home-and-away in a round-robin format. The group winners and runners-up advanced to the round of 16, while the third-placed teams entered the 2020–21 UEFA Europa League round of 32. The matchdays were 20–21 October, 27–28 October, 3–4 November, 24–25 November, 1–2 December and 8–9 December 2020.

The youth teams of the clubs that qualified for the group stage were also set to participate in the 2020–21 UEFA Youth League, along with the youth domestic champions of the top 32 associations, in a single-leg knockout tournament. However, that tournament was later cancelled as a result of the COVID-19 pandemic.

İstanbul Başakşehir, Krasnodar, Midtjylland and Rennes made their debut appearances in the group stage. With İstanbul Başakşehir's appearance in the group stage, Istanbul became the first city to be represented in the group stage by four different teams (having been previously represented by Beşiktaş, Fenerbahçe and Galatasaray). This season became the first in the history of the Champions League in which three Russian clubs played in the group stage.

Group A

Group B

Group C

Group D

Group E

Group F

Group G

Group H

Knockout phase

In the knockout phase, teams played against each other over two legs on a home-and-away basis, except for the one-match final.

Bracket

Round of 16

Quarter-finals

Semi-finals

Final

Statistics
Statistics exclude qualifying rounds and play-off round.

Top goalscorers

Top assists

Squad of the season
The UEFA technical study group selected the following 23 players as the squad of the tournament.

Players of the season

Votes were cast for players of the season by coaches of the 32 teams in the group stage, together with 55 journalists selected by the European Sports Media (ESM) group, representing each of UEFA's member associations. The coaches were not allowed to vote for players from their own teams. Jury members selected their top three players, with the first receiving five points, the second three and the third one. The shortlist of the top three players was announced on 13 August 2021. The award winners were announced and presented during the 2021–22 UEFA Champions League group stage draw in Turkey on 26 August 2021.

Goalkeeper of the season

Defender of the season

Midfielder of the season

Forward of the season

See also
2020–21 UEFA Europa League
2021 UEFA Super Cup
2020–21 UEFA Women's Champions League
2020–21 UEFA Youth League
2020–21 UEFA Futsal Champions League

Notes

References

External links

Fixtures and Results, 2020–21, UEFA.com

 
1
2020-21
Association football events postponed due to the COVID-19 pandemic